Dudusa sphingiformis is a moth of the  family Notodontidae. It is found in Asia, including India, Burma, Korea and Japan.

Adults are on wing from May to August.

External links
naris.go.kr
Japanese moths

Notodontidae
Moths of Japan